Colonel Paul Manueli (30 January 1934 - February 2019) was a former Commander of the Royal Fiji Military Forces,  a former Fiji Cabinet minister, Senator and successful businessman.

Biography

Military career

Manueli was of Rotuman and Samoan descent, he was a soldier in the Royal Fiji Military Forces, and a graduate of the Royal Military Academy Sandhurst in England. He had a distinguished career with the Fijian military, and while still a lieutenant, was appointed to the post of district officer on Rotuma for an interim period in 1960. He went on to become a Colonel and the first indigenous Commander of the Fiji Military Forces, which he led from 22 February 1974 until February 22, 1979.

Post-Military Career
Following his retirement, he enjoyed considerable success as a business leader and served on the boards of numerous corporations, including General Manager of BP in the South Pacific. After the 1987 Fijian coups d'état, Manueli held the portfolios of Minister for Home Affairs, Finance Minister and Minister for Justice in the Fijian Parliamentary Cabinet. Originally a member of the post-coup interim government, Manueli subsequently sought election and won the sole seat for the Rotuman Communal Constituency and was made a Cabinet Minister in Sitiveni Rabuka's governments. His most recent position was as Rotuma's representative on the Great Council of Chiefs, which was abolished in 2012. He also was a member of the executive board of Warwick International Hotels.

References

2019 deaths
Fijian soldiers
Rotuman members of the Senate (Fiji)
Fijian military leaders
Graduates of the Royal Military Academy Sandhurst
1934 births
Fijian people of Samoan descent
20th-century Fijian businesspeople
Rotuman members of the House of Representatives (Fiji)
Finance Ministers of Fiji
Government ministers of Fiji